Pseudotelphusa basifasciella is a moth of the family Gelechiidae. It is found in North America, where it has been recorded from Alabama, Arkansas, Georgia, Illinois, Indiana, Kentucky, Louisiana, Maine, Mississippi, New Hampshire, New York, North Carolina, Oklahoma, South Carolina, Tennessee and Texas.

The wingspan is 10–15 mm. The forewings are white with two black spots along the costa and smaller spots and speckling near the outer margin, as well as a thick black oblique band in the basal area. The hindwings are whitish basally, shading to grey distally. Adults are on wing in late spring and summer.

References

Moths described in 1873
Pseudotelphusa